Krishnadev Prasad Gaud (b. 1895) also known as Bedhab Banarasi was an Indian Bhojpuri poet and professor. He was the principal of DAV College Varanasi and the member of State Legislative Council (India) of Uttar Pradesh.

Career 
In 1930 he became the editor of the weekly journal named Bhut which was used to be published from Varanasi. In 1934, He became the editor of the journal named Khuda Ki Raj Par and later wrote for the daily newspaper named Aaj.

Works 

 Badheb Ki Baithak
 Kavya Kamal
 Banarasi Ikka
 Gandhi Ka Bhut
 Tanatan
 Abhineeta

References 

1895 births
Bhojpuri-language writers
Date of death missing